Louie Zumbach (born October 28, 1965) is an American politician who served as a member of the Iowa House of Representatives for the 95th district from 2017 to 2021. He currently serves on the Linn County Board of Supervisors.

References

Members of the Iowa House of Representatives
1965 births
Living people
21st-century American politicians